Big cock may refer to:

 An unusually large human penis size
 Big Cock, a 1986 album by  King Kurt
  大公雞 ('Big Cock'), a 2001 album by Four Golden Princess
 Big Cock, a fictional character in The Eleven Little Roosters
 "Big Cock", an episode of Trailer Park Boys
 Big Cocks, a series of photographs by Heji Shin

See also
 Cockerel
 Patrol torpedo boat PT-617, also known as Big Red Cock